This list of mines in Botswana is subsidiary to the list of mines article and lists working, defunct and future mines in the country and is organised by the primary mineral output. For practical purposes stone, marble and other quarries may be included in this list.

Diamond
Damtshaa diamond mine
Jwaneng diamond mine
Letlhakane diamond mine
Lerala diamond mine
Karowe diamond mine
Orapa diamond mine
 #note some mines are closed

Copper-nickel
BCl copper-nickel mine, Selibe Phikwe

This mine is now closed

Gold
Francistown 

Golden Eagle Mine

Mopane Mine

Nickel
Phoenix nickel mine
Selkirk mine

Coal
Letlhakane coal mine
Mea coal mine
Mmamabula
Morupule Colliery
Sese coal mine

Uranium
Letlhakane mine

References

Botswana
 
Mines